Gomphrena haageana, the Rio Grande globe amaranth, is a herbaceous perennial plant that acts as an annual in temperate climates. The most common cultivar is known as Strawberry Fields globe amaranth. It has a red flower reminiscent of a strawberry.

Description
It has red strawberry-like flower heads. Leaves are narrowly inverted-lanceshaped to linear-oblong, pointed to rather blunt with a small point at the tip, long-narrowed at the base, rather thinly appressed-hairy on both surfaces, the pair of leaves subtending the at branch-ends inflorescence stalkless, lanceshaped-ovate, long-tapering. It is native to Texas and Mexico.

References

 General Information
 Native Distribution in U.S.

haageana
Flora of the United States
Taxa named by Johann Friedrich Klotzsch